Dewi Muria Agung (born 16 December 1985), better known by her stage name Dewi Persik (also spelled Dewi Perssik) and nicknamed Depe after her monogram, is an Indonesian dangdut singer.

Biography
Persik was born Dewi Muria Agung in Jember, East Java on 16 December 1985. She is the youngest of four children born to Mochammad Aidil and Sri Muna. She also has some Chinese ancestry. She later became a dangdut singer, becoming noticed for her "saw move", so named because it resembles the back and forth movement of a saw. She was given the stage name Persik after the Indonesian word for peach, which is thought to bring good luck in Chinese culture. She is also known by the nickname "Depe".

During 2008, she raised controversy for her "vulgar" movements and outfits while performing onstage and was banned from performing in Tangerang and Bandung; Bandung mayor Dada Rosada stated that her "sexually provocative" movements did not qualify as art or culture. After she apologized and promised to keep her performances tamer, Minister for Youth and Sports Affairs Adhyaksa Dault said that she should be respected for "admitting her mistake".

Two years later, she raised controversy after several nude pictures of her were released online. The Islamic Defenders Front (FPI) reported her to the Jakarta police, alleging that the pictures violated the 2008 Bill against Pornography and Pornoaction. The FPI also made plans to throw rotten eggs at her house, and a spokesman compared her to Japanese pornographic actress Maria Ozawa. Persik later admitted that the pictures were of her, and that she often posed in the nude with her hair covering her breasts; however, she also noted that the pictures were meant to be private and that said that she was surprised that they had found their way to the internet.

During the filming of Arwah Goyang Karawang (The Dancing Spirit of Karawang), Persik got into a "catfight" with fellow actress Julia Perez. Both later filed police reports, with Perez later being brought to trial in May 2011.

In early 2011, Persik underwent hymen reconstruction surgery in As-Salam International Hospital, Cairo, Egypt after going on the hajj. She said that she didn't want to "disappoint her future husband"; she noted that she was proud of her secondary virginity. After facing incredulity, she produced medical records to prove that she was "officially" a virgin.

, she is expected to act in the horror/comedy Pacar Hantu Perawan (Boyfriend of a Virgin Ghost) along with an unnamed foreign porn star. She noted that, although there would be a love story in the movie, it would be chaste enough for Indonesian culture. She is currently managed by Ahmad Dhani's Republik Cinta Manajemen.

Personal life
Persik has been married two times. Her first marriage was to fellow dangdut singer Saiful Jamil; they were married on 26 June 2005 and divorced on 14 January 2008. Her second was to actor Aldiansyah Taher; they entered a siri marriage (unrecognized by the government, but recognized by tradition) on 4 July 2008, later splitting in 2009.

Case
Following her on-set clash with Julia Perez, Dewi Persik was in February 2014 sentenced to three months in jail by the Supreme Court.

Filmography

Film

TV Series

References
Footnotes

Bibliography

External links
 

1985 births
Living people
21st-century Indonesian women singers
Indonesian dangdut singers
Indonesian film actresses
Indonesian stage actresses
People from Jember Regency